Bluster may refer to:

 Bluster Kong, a character in Donkey Kong Country

See also
 Blustery Cliffs